Saint Sava Serbian Orthodox Monastery is located in Libertyville, Illinois. Located in the same place is the campus of St. Sava's Serbian Orthodox Seminary.

The property is listed on the National Register of Historic Places.

References

 https://orthodox-world.org/en/i/25376/United-States/Illinois/Libertyville/Monastery/Saint-Sava-Serbian-Orthodox-Monastery

External links
 Serbian Orthodox Church in the United States of America and Canada

Sources
 

Eastern Orthodoxy in Illinois
Properties of religious function on the National Register of Historic Places in Illinois